God's Plan is the third mixtape by hip hop group G-Unit. The remix of Missy Elliott's song "Work It", from her album Under Construction, which features 50 Cent, is included in the mixtape. Also the track "Niggas" featuring 2 verses from The Notorious B.I.G. from his posthumous album, Born Again, on the song of the same name was featured on the soundtrack of the film Bad Boys II in 2003. After recording the mixtape, 50 Cent released his commercial debut album Get Rich or Die Tryin' in 2003. The World's verse was used in the remix to Cry Me a River by Justin Timberlake. It was named the 9th best mixtape ever by XXL magazine.

Track listing

Personnel
Lists of the personnel it is confirmed on AllMusic.

 50 Cent — Primary Artist
 Governor — Primary Artist
 G-Unit — Primary Artist
 Missy — Primary Artist

References

External links
 

50 Cent albums
2002 mixtape albums
God in culture